The men's time trial class B track cycling event at the 2020 Summer Paralympics took place on 28 August 2021 in the Izu Velodrome, Japan. This class is for the cyclist who is blind or has visual impairments, they will then ride with tandem bicycles together with a sighted cyclist (also known as the pilot). There will be 10 pairs from 9 different nations competing.

Competition format
The 10 pairs are placed into their own heats individually (1 heat including 1 pair) where they will then do a time trial basis where the fastest pair would win gold, 2nd fastest a silver, and 3rd fastest a bronze. The distance of this event is 1000m.

Schedule
All times are Japan Standard Time (UTC+9)

Records

Results

References

Men's time trial B